In mathematics, and in particular in group theory, a cyclic permutation (or cycle) is a permutation of the elements of some set X which maps the elements of some subset S of X to each other in a cyclic fashion, while fixing (that is, mapping to themselves) all other elements of X.  If S has k elements, the cycle is called a k-cycle. Cycles are often denoted by the list of their elements enclosed with parentheses, in the order to which they are permuted.

For example, given X = {1, 2, 3, 4}, the permutation (1, 3, 2, 4) that sends 1 to 3, 3 to 2, 2 to 4 and 4 to 1 (so S = X) is a 4-cycle, and the permutation (1, 3, 2) that sends 1 to 3, 3 to 2, 2 to 1 and 4 to 4 (so S = {1, 2, 3} and 4 is a fixed element) is a 3-cycle.  On the other hand, the permutation that sends 1 to 3, 3 to 1, 2 to 4 and 4 to 2 is not a cyclic permutation because it separately permutes the pairs {1, 3} and {2, 4}.

The set S is called the orbit of the cycle. Every permutation on finitely many elements can be decomposed into cycles on disjoint orbits.

The individual cyclic parts of a permutation are also called cycles, thus the second example is composed of a 3-cycle and a 1-cycle (or fixed point) and the third is composed of two 2-cycles, and denoted (1, 3) (2, 4).

Definition 

A permutation is called a cyclic permutation if and only if it has a single nontrivial cycle (a cycle of length > 1).

For example, the permutation, written in two-line notation (in two ways) and also cycle notation,

is a six-cycle; its cycle diagram is shown at right.

Some authors restrict the definition to only those permutations which consist of one nontrivial cycle (that is, no fixed points allowed).

For example, the permutation

is a cyclic permutation under this more restrictive definition, while the preceding example is not.

More formally, a permutation  of a set X, viewed as a bijective function , is called a cycle if the action on X of the subgroup generated by  has at most one orbit with more than a single element. This notion is most commonly used when X is a finite set; then of course the largest orbit, S, is also finite. Let  be any element of S, and put  for any .

 for 0 ≤ i < k

The elements not fixed by  can be pictured as

.

A cycle can be written using the compact cycle notation  (there are no commas between elements in this notation, to avoid confusion with a k-tuple). The length of a cycle is the number of elements of its largest orbit.  A cycle of length k is also called a k-cycle.

The orbit of a 1-cycle is called a fixed point of the permutation, but as a permutation every 1-cycle is the identity permutation. When cycle notation is used, the 1-cycles are often suppressed when no confusion will result.

Basic properties 
One of the basic results on symmetric groups is that any permutation can be expressed as the product of disjoint cycles (more precisely: cycles with disjoint orbits); such cycles commute with each other, and the expression of the permutation is unique up to the order of the cycles. The multiset of lengths of the cycles in this expression (the cycle type) is therefore uniquely determined by the permutation, and both the signature and the conjugacy class of  the permutation in the symmetric group are determined by it.

A k-cycle has signature (−1)k − 1.

The inverse of a cycle  is given by reversing the order of the entries: .  In particular, since , every two-cycle is its own inverse.  Since disjoint cycles commute, the inverse of a product of disjoint cycles is the result of reversing each of the cycles separately.

Transpositions 

A cycle with only two elements is called a transposition. For example, the permutation  that swaps 2 and 4.

Properties 
Any permutation can be expressed as the composition (product) of transpositions—formally, they are generators for the group. This follows because an arbitrary transposition can be expressed as the product of adjacent transpositions. Concretely, one can express the transposition  where  by moving  to  one step at a time, then moving  back to where  was, which interchanges these two and makes no other changes:

The decomposition of a permutation into a product of transpositions is obtained for example by writing the permutation as a product of disjoint cycles, and then splitting iteratively each of the cycles of length 3 and longer into a product of a transposition and a cycle of length one less:

In fact, the symmetric group is a Coxeter group, meaning that it is generated by elements of order 2 (the adjacent transpositions), and all relations are of a certain form.

One of the main results on symmetric groups states that either all of the decompositions of a given permutation into transpositions have an even number of transpositions, or they all have an odd number of transpositions. This  permits the parity of a permutation to be a well-defined concept.

See also 
 Cycle sort – a sorting algorithm that is based on the idea that the permutation to be sorted can be factored into cycles, which can individually be rotated to give a sorted result
 Cycles and fixed points
 Cyclic permutation of integer
 Cycle notation
 Circular permutation in proteins
 Fisher–Yates shuffle

Notes

References

Sources 
 Anderson, Marlow and Feil, Todd (2005), A First Course in Abstract Algebra, Chapman & Hall/CRC; 2nd edition. .

External links 

Permutations